Kenneth Eli Osterberger (April 3, 1930 – August 10, 2016) was an American politician. He served as a Democratic and later a Republican member of the Louisiana State Senate.

Life and career 
Kenneth Eli Osterberger was born April 3, 1930, the son of George Breazeale. He attended Louisiana State University, where he was a member of Lambda Chi Alpha and served as student body president from 1952 to 1953.

Osterberger served in the United States Army during the Korean War. He was a second lieutenant.

In 1969, Osterberger was elected to the Metropolitan Council, the legislative branch of the City of Baton Rouge and Parish of East Baton Rouge, Louisiana, and was then selected by the members of the council to be President Pro Tempore, serving until 1972. In 1971 he was elected as a Democrat to the Louisiana State Senate for East Baton Rouge Parish; he was re-elected four times, in 1975 defeating David Duke in Duke's first run for public office and in 1983 and 1987 after changing his party affiliation to Republican. In 1992 he was succeeded by Jay Dardenne.

Personal life and death
Osterberger was married twice, to Margaret Simmons and to Harriet Osterberger, and had four children. He died on August 10, 2016, of Alzheimer's disease, at the age of 86.

References 

1930 births
2016 deaths
Louisiana state senators
Louisiana Democrats
Louisiana Republicans
20th-century American politicians
Louisiana State University alumni
Deaths from Alzheimer's disease